Eileen Foreman is a former England women's international footballer.

Career

Foreman helped take Warminster L.F.C. to the 1975 WFA Cup Final.

International career

Eileen Foreman made her first appearance for England against Scotland on 18 November 1972, winning England's 3–2 victory.

References

Living people
People from Warminster
English women's footballers
Women's association football wingers
England women's international footballers
Year of birth missing (living people)